Neajlovu may refer to several villages in Romania:

 Neajlovu, a village in Morteni Commune, Dâmboviţa County
 Neajlovu, a village in Clejani Commune, Giurgiu County